Friederike Lienig (December 8, 1790 – 7 June, 1855) was a Latvian entomologist. Four species of tiny moths are named after her. One is Cosmopterix lienigiella. At first self taught she was later instructed by Philipp Christoph Zeller at the technical high school in Meseritz.She was a Member of the Stettin Entomological Society.
 
She described several new moths including Ortholepis vacciniella, Udea inquinatalis, Argyresthia pulchella and Coleophora deauratella with Philipp Christoph Zeller.

Works
Lepidopterologische Fauna von Livland und Curland (m. Anm. v. P. C. Zeller), in: Isis v. Oken 1846, 175-302

References
 BBLD - Baltisches biografisches Lexikon digital 

1790 births
1855 deaths
19th-century Latvian people
Baltic-German people
Lepidopterists